Agonopterix dryocrates is a moth in the family Depressariidae. It was described by Edward Meyrick in 1921. It is found in South Africa.

References

Endemic moths of South Africa
Moths described in 1921
Agonopterix
Moths of Africa